In the theory of probability, the Glivenko–Cantelli theorem (sometimes referred to as the Fundamental Theorem of Statistics), named after Valery Ivanovich Glivenko and Francesco Paolo Cantelli,  determines the asymptotic behaviour of the empirical distribution function as the number of independent and identically distributed observations grows.

The uniform convergence of  more general empirical measures becomes an important property of the Glivenko–Cantelli classes of functions or sets.  The Glivenko–Cantelli classes arise in Vapnik–Chervonenkis theory, with applications to machine learning. Applications can be found in econometrics making use of M-estimators.

Statement 

where  is the indicator function of the set . For every (fixed) ,  is a sequence of random variables which converge to  almost surely by the strong law of large numbers.

Theorem
 almost surely.

This theorem originates with Valery Glivenko and Francesco Cantelli, in 1933.

Remarks
The Glivenko–Cantelli theorem gives a stronger mode of convergence than this in the iid case.
An even stronger uniform convergence result for the empirical distribution function is available in the form of an extended type of law of the iterated logarithm. See asymptotic properties of the empirical distribution function for this and related results.

Proof 
For simplicity, consider a case of continuous random variable . Now for all  there exists  such that . Note that

 

Therefore,

 

Since  by strong law of large numbers, we can guarantee that for any positive  and any integer  such that , we can find  such that for all , we have . Combined with the above result, this further implies that , which is the definition of almost sure convergence.

Empirical measures
One can generalize the empirical distribution function by replacing the set  by an arbitrary set C from a class of sets  to obtain an empirical measure indexed by sets 

Where  is the indicator function of each set .

Glivenko–Cantelli class
Consider a set  with a sigma algebra of Borel subsets A and a probability measure P. For a class of subsets,

and a class of functions

define random variables

where  is the empirical measure,  is the corresponding map, and

, assuming that it exists.

Definitions
 A class  is called a  Glivenko–Cantelli class  (or GC class) with respect to a probability measure P if any of the following equivalent statements is true.
3.
The Glivenko–Cantelli classes of functions are defined similarly.
A class is called a universal Glivenko–Cantelli class if it is a GC class with respect to any probability measure P on (S,A).
A class is called uniformly Glivenko–Cantelli if the convergence occurs uniformly over all probability measures P on (S,A):

Theorem (Vapnik and Chervonenkis, 1968)
 A class of sets  is uniformly GC if and only if it is a Vapnik–Chervonenkis class.

Examples
The classical Glivenko–Cantelli theorem implies that this class is a universal GC class. Furthermore, by Kolmogorov's theorem,

See also
 Donsker's theorem
 Dvoretzky–Kiefer–Wolfowitz inequality – strengthens the Glivenko–Cantelli theorem by quantifying the rate of convergence.

References

Further reading

Empirical process
Asymptotic theory (statistics)
Probability theorems
Theorems in statistics